The Detroit Regional Yacht-racing Association (DRYA) was established in 1912 as the Detroit River Yachting Association by the Commodores of the Detroit Boat Club and the Detroit Yacht Club, Commodore Harry Austin and Commodore Harry Kendall, respectively.

Founded to be a clearing board to assist local clubs in resolving conflicts with their individual summer regatta calendars, the DRYA is now a Michigan Corporation and a registered non-profit organization. The DRYA's incorporation articles summarize its purpose:

The purpose of the association is to encourage and promote, in the United States and Canada, the general interest in boating, yachting, and sail racing by amateur sailors (including junior and collegiate sailors) by all appropriate means, including:

Establishing high standards of skill for seamanship, boathandling, and navigation of yachts;
Encouraging the ownership of boats and yachts by individuals and member clubs and the development of suitable seaworthy yachts for racing and cruising;
Encouraging and improving the quality of racing by developing and publishing standard sailing instructions, by assisting and supporting member clubs in coordinating the scheduling of races, regattas, and related events, by serving in an advisory capacity to member clubs in the organization, conduct and scoring of races and regattas, by providing equipment for conducting races and qualified judges to hear and decide protests and appeals and by any and all other appropriate means;
 Improving communications among member clubs and individuals interested in racing and in general, to make known to the member clubs the desires of sailors eligible to race in their regattas;
 Promoting, developing, adopting and equitably administering rating and handicapping rules for racing and providing handicaps to members and others;
 Maintaining membership in the United States Sailing Association as a "yacht racing association" and, from time to time, membership in other organizations with similar or related purposes;
 Acting as an intermediary between member clubs and individuals in their relations with civic and governmental bodies when the general interests and welfare of boating, yachting and sail racing are involved;
 Maintaining harmonious relations among its member clubs and individuals.

Members

Albatross Yacht Club 
Bayview Yacht Club 
Crescent Sail Yacht Club 
Detroit Boat Club
Detroit Sail Club 
Detroit Yacht Club 
Doublehanded Sailing Association 
Edison Boat Club 
Ford Yacht Club 
Grayhaven Sail Club of Detroit 
Great Lakes Yacht Club 
Grosse Isle Yacht Club
Grosse Pointe Club
Grosse Pointe Sail Club
Grosse Pointe Yacht Club
Lake Shore Sail Club 
North Star Sail Club 
North Cape Yacht Club 
Pontiac Yacht Club
Port Huron Yacht Club 
Sailing Singles
Sarnia Yacht Club 
South Port Sailing Club
St. Clair Yacht Club 
Toledo Yacht Club 
West Shore Sail Club 
Windsor Yacht Club

External links
  http://www.drya.org/

Yachting associations in the United States
Clubs and societies in Michigan
Non-profit organizations based in Michigan
Organizations based in Detroit
Sports in Detroit
1912 establishments in Michigan
Sports organizations established in 1912